Elections to Moyle District Council were held on 7 June 2001 on the same day as the other Northern Irish local government elections. The election used three district electoral areas to elect a total of 15 councillors.

Election results

Note: "Votes" are the first preference votes.

Districts summary

|- class="unsortable" align="centre"
!rowspan=2 align="left"|Ward
! % 
!Cllrs
! % 
!Cllrs
! %
!Cllrs
! %
!Cllrs
! % 
!Cllrs
!rowspan=2|TotalCllrs
|- class="unsortable" align="center"
!colspan=2 bgcolor="" | SDLP
!colspan=2 bgcolor="" | DUP
!colspan=2 bgcolor="" | UUP
!colspan=2 bgcolor="" | Sinn Féin
!colspan=2 bgcolor="white"| Others
|-
|align="left"|Ballycastle
|bgcolor="#99FF66"|32.3
|bgcolor="#99FF66"|2
|14.2
|1
|15.5
|1
|12.2
|0
|25.8
|1
|5
|-
|align="left"|Giant's Causeway
|3.7
|0
|bgcolor="#D46A4C"|47.5
|bgcolor="#D46A4C"|2
|30.0
|2
|0.0
|0
|18.8
|1
|5
|-
|align="left"|The Glens
|29.8
|2
|7.0
|0
|0.0
|0
|14.4
|1
|bgcolor="#DDDDDD"|48.8
|bgcolor="#DDDDDD"|2
|5
|-'
|-
|- class="unsortable" class="sortbottom" style="background:#C9C9C9"
|align="left"| Total
|23.2
|4
|21.0
|3
|13.8
|3
|9.5
|1
|32.5
|4
|15
|-
|}

Districts results

Ballycastle

1997: 2 x Independent, 1 x SDLP, 1 x UUP, 1 x DUP
2001: 2 x SDLP, 1 x UUP, 1 x DUP, 1 x Independent
1997-2001 Change: SDLP gain from Independent

Giant's Causeway

1997: 2 x DUP, 2 x UUP, 1 x Independent Unionist
2001: 2 x DUP, 2 x UUP, 1 x Independent
1997-2001 Change: Independent Unionist becomes Independent

The Glens

1997: 2 x SDLP, 2 x Independent Nationalist, 1 x Sinn Féin
2001: 2 x Sinn Féin, 2 x SDLP, 1 x Independent
1997-2001 Change: Independent Nationalists (two seats) become Independents

References

Moyle District Council elections
Moyle